Kasturi Pattanaik is a pioneering Odissi dance exponent, performer, choreographer, teacher, trainer and music composer from India.

Profile
Kasturi Pattanaik’s compositions and choreographies in Odissi Dance are well acclaimed for their originality and creative diversity. She has introduced new concepts, new ideas, new techniques, new co-ordination, new linkages and new themes in Odissi Dance repertory.

Pattanaik is both an accomplished soloist and group performer. She is also one of the pioneers of Odissi dance drama, particularly blending the classical and folk traditions of Odisha and the great pan-Indian mythological stories. Being an proficient Odissi music composer, Pattanaik has integrated Odissi music in its original and undiluted format in her innovative and imaginative compositions and choreographies in Odissi dance.

Kasturi Pattanaik started her Odissi dance learning, along with Kathak Dance from her childhood. After completing her graduation from the prestigious Shailabala Women's College, Cuttack, Odisha; she joined Odissi Research Centre (ORC), Bhubaneswar in its first batch for her advanced intensive course in Odissi dance.

Pattanaik has the rare distinction of learning and performing under the foremost Odissi dance Gurus/maestros; including Late Raghunath Dutta, Late Padma Vibhushan Kelucharan Mohapatra, Padma Shri Kumkum Mohanty, Padma Shri Gangadhar Pradhan, Ramani Ranjan Jena and Dayanidhi Das.

From an early age, she travelled across the country and world to perform and disseminate Odissi dance. She also conducted workshops in various countries; including in Hong Kong, USSR, Indonesia, Thailand, Singapore, North Korea and China.

Pattanaik has trained more than four hundred students across the country and abroad in Odissi dance; many of whom have established themselves either as acclaimed performers or as Gurus.

After her stint in Odissi Research Centre as the choreographer; she moved to New Delhi and joined the India’s national nodal cultural organization-‘SANKALP’ as its Programme Director (Culture) and Creative Head. In SANKALP, she broadened her arena of activities to include education, research and policy strategies; besides her main activities related to promotion of Indian Art and Culture.

She has also served the Ministry of Culture, Government of India in its various expert committees.

Pattanaik has also performed leading roles in Odia Films and National Doordarshan Channel serials. Her Doordarshan serial on ‘Debadasi” is a classic masterpiece on Debadasi traditions.

She was a member of Regional Committee of the Central Board of Film Certification. She has also anchored eight episodes of primary education programmes, produced by the State Institute of Technology (SIT), Bhubaneswar under the Ministry of Human Resource Development, Government of India.

She has played a pioneering role in syllabus preparation for B.A & B.A. (Hons.) courses in Odissi Dance of Indira Kala Sangeet Vishwavidyalaya (IKSVV), Khairagarh, Chhattisgarh. She has also served as the Jury of the ‘Kalidas Samman’ and ‘Tulsi Samman’, prestigious arts awards, presented annually by the Government of Madhya Pradesh.

She has also received a number of awards and acclaims for her achievements in promoting the diversity of Indian culture expressions.

Achievements and contributions
Pattanaik is still with SANKALP, an NGO described as "very good" and "of particular interest" by the Government of India Committee, headed by J. S. Verma, former Chief Justice of India. As the programme director for culture, Pattanaik promotes cultural and natural heritage.

She has created nine pallavis:
 Charukeshi
 Pattadeep
 Gati Sammikrutta 
 Hansadhwoni
 Narayani
 Janasammohini
 Asavari
 Bageshri
 Sankaravaran-1-for the beginners
 Sankaravaran-2
 Koushik Dhwoni
 Yog

Dance dramas include:
 The Deer Krishnasara (Krushnasara Mruga)
 Yama Savitri Sambad
 Rasa Trayee
 Kanchi Abhiyan
 Chitrangada
 Sthitaprajna
 Sabari Upakhyanam

ICCR Empanelled Artist
Kasturi Pattanaik is empanelled  in the Indian Council for Cultural Relations (ICCR).

Honours
 Rajendra Prasad Puraskar from "Rajendra Prasad Smruti Sansad" at Cuttack, Orissa, 1997
 "Abhinandanika – 1999" for excellent Abhinay in Odissi dance from Vishnupriya Smruti Sammana at Puri, Orissa 
 Scholarships from the state in 1987 and the Ministry of Human Resource Development in 2000
 "Debadasi Samman" from  Udayan Sanskritik Anusthan, 2003
 Juries of the Central Board of Film Certification for 2002
 Honoured from Kuchipudi Natyakala Mandali in Kuchipudi District, Andhra Pradesh in 1999
 Mahari Award-2015, instituted by Adi Guru Pankaj Charan Das

Festivals
 India Festival, USSR, 1987
 Spring Festival, North Korea, 1990 (ICCR)
 Kalinga Bali Yatra (Indonesia, Jakarta, Bali, Singapore, Thailand)
 Solo Performances (Hong Kong, China, Japan), 1994
 Khajuraho Festival, 1992 and 2007
 Ekamra Utsav, 2007
 Ellora Festival, 1991
 Nisagandhi Festival, 1989
 Surya Festival, 1990, 1992, 2010
 Sidhendra Yogi Dance Festival, Kuchipudi, 1998, 1999, 2000
 Udaya Shankar Dance Festivals, 2000
 Konark Dance Festival, 1989 to 2004
 Konarka Nata Mandap Festival, 1988
 Central SNA Youth Festivals
 Yuva Nrita Utsav, 1992, 1996, 2003
 Odissi International, Bhubaneswar, 2010
 Utkal Divas-Rourkela, 2010, 2014
 SANKALP Festival Series, Mysore 2010 and Benguluru 2010
 Commonwealth Game, New Delhi, 2010
 Oriya Cinema 75 Years Celebration Day, Bhubaneswar, 2011
 Utkal Devas, Dehradun, 2011
 Inaugural Function of 150th Birth Anniversary of Guru Rabindranath Tagore, Bhopal, 2011
 Betwa Mahotsav, Vidisha, 2011
 Satna Mahotsav, Satna, 2012
 SANKALP’s National Festival on New Creations in Odissi Dance, 2012
 Konark Festival, 2012
 Khajuraho Festival, 2014

Research
Kasturi Pattanaik was the Program Coordinator of the Planning Commission, Government of India research project titled “Promotion of Diversity of India’s Cultural Expressions- An Impact Assessment Study of Central Sangeet Natak Academy (SNA)’. It is a significant study on one of the premier autonomous cultural bodies of the Ministry of Culture, Government of India.

See also
 Indian women in dance
 Odissi

References

1966 births
Living people
Odissi exponents
Indian female classical dancers
Performers of Indian classical dance
Indian classical choreographers
People from Cuttack
Indian women choreographers
Indian choreographers
Dancers from Odisha
20th-century Indian dancers
20th-century Indian women artists
Women artists from Odisha